This is a list of Air Force-controlled (AFCON) Wings of the United States Air Force.

The United States Air Force from c.1948 onward had two main types of wings and groups: AFCON, those controlled by Headquarters Air Force and usually having one, two, or three digits, and listed here; and Major Air Command-controlled (MAJCON) wings and groups, having four digits, controlled by Major Commands and listed at List of MAJCOM wings of the United States Air Force. After the fall of the Soviet Union and the end of the Cold War, Headquarters Air Force terminated the ability of the Major Commands to control their own wings and groups. Thus all USAF flying and combat wings now have three digits and are controlled by Headquarters Air Force. Most are designated in one series, 1-900s. However, there are exceptions, such as the several wings designated "1st," as well as the two wings designated "301st".

Air control and warning groups, like the 11th Air Control Wing, Elmendorf AFB, Alaska, part of Alaskan Air Command; the predecessor of the 507th Tactical Air Control Wing, Shaw AFB, SC, under Tactical Air Command, designated the 507 C&C Group 15 July 1958; 507 TCG 1 July 1964; 507 TACG 15 June 1974; 507 TACW 1 October 1976. Redesignated 507 ACW 1 October 1991. Inactivated 12 June 1992; disbanded 8 September 1994. which included 20th TASS, 1990–91; 703rd TASS, 1967–88; were numbered in a separate series.

Flying and combat wings 
Remaining wings to add include the:
2nd Aircraft Delivery Group; 22nd Air Refueling Wing, 33rd Fighter Wing, 52nd Fighter Wing; 53rd Wing, Eglin AFB, Fl.,; 55th Wing, Offutt AFB, NE; a large number of Air National Guard wings; 
314th; 319th; 320th; 321st Air Expeditionary Wing; 375th Air Mobility Wing (most active); the 1st Photographic Charting Group was disbanded on 5 October 1944 but then reconstituted on 31 July 1985 and redesignated the 358th Special Operations Group, but not activated.
428th Military Airlift Group (former 28th Transport Group); 429th Combat Crew Training Group (former 29th Transport Group); 
432d Wing; 433d Airlift Wing; 434th Air Refueling Wing; 435th Air Ground Operations Wing; 436th and 437th Airlift Wings; 440th; 442nd; the 447th Air Expeditionary Group, which was activated 18 December 2015 at Incirlik Air Base, Turkey, and which remains active;
453rd; 455th Air Expeditionary Wing; 457th Air Expeditionary Group; 458th Air Expeditionary Group; 469th Bombardment Group; 470th Electronic Warfare Group formerly the 470th Bombardment Group; 472d Special Operations Wing (never active); 484th Air Expeditionary Wing; 491st Bombardment Group; 493rd Bombardment Group; 495th Fighter Group; 496th Fighter Training Group, inactivated 26 April 1945; 
MAJCOM but three-digit MATS wings: 518th Air Transport Wing; 520th Air Transport Wing; 525th Air Transport Wing and 540th Air Transport Wings;
517th Training Group; 518th Air Refueling Wing from WWII 68th Composite Wing; 521st Air Mobility Operations Wing; 522nd-524th, 525th Combat Crew Training Group, the former 25th Antisubmarine Wing; 527th-529th; 530th; 536 Cbt Crew Tng Gp WW II 26 Ferrying Group; 541st Balloon Gp pre WW II Organized Reserve unit, disbanded; 549th Tactical Air Support Training Group (inactive since 1988); 550th Tactical Missile Wing the former 550th Guided Missiles Wing; 551st; 553d, 554th, 555th all Balloon Gps, pre WW II Organized Reserve units, disbanded;; no entry or data for 556; 562d Balloon Gp pre WW II Organized Reserve unit, disbanded; 563d Balloon Group also; 558th-579th; 590th-599th; 
600th Air Base Group, Torrejon Air Base, Spain, 1992-1994; 604th Regional Support Group; - would leave McClellan for March AFB in July 1997; 605th; 606th Support With (constituted 1 January 1992, revoked 27 January 1992); [607th?] 608th Military Airlift Group-->608th Airlift Support Group; [609-611] 612th Theatre Operations Group; 615th Contingency Response Wing; [616-622d?]; 623d Wing; 624th Regional Support Group; [625-627?]; the 628th Air Base Wing was activated on 8 January 2010 as Charleston Air Force Base was merged with Naval Weapons Station Charleston as a result of changes after Base Realignment and Closure Commission recommendations; [629-632?] 634th?; 644?; 4000th Air Force Base Unit (Air Base) at Wright-Patterson AFB redesignated 2750th Air Base Wing on 5 October 1949, then redesignated 645th Air Base Wing on 1 October 1992, then redesignated the 88th Air Base Wing on 1 October 1994; 646th Air Base Wing former 3200 Support Wing at Eglin AFB, FL; 648th Support Group/648th Air Base Group, to c1994 at Brooks AFB, TX; 649th Support Group 1992-94 at Hill AFB, UT; 653d Electronic Systems Wing; 665th Air Base Wing; 720th Special Tactics Group; 724th Special Tactics Group; 821st Air Base Group, Thule Air Base, Greenland, 2002-c2020, and others.

List of wings and groups, 1-926 

Other active wings in the 900 series as of January 2023 include the 908th Airlift Wing; the 910th Airlift Wing; the 911th Airlift Wing; the 914th Air Refueling Wing, the 916th Air Refueling Wing; the 926th Wing, the 927th Air Refueling Wing; the 931st Air Refueling Wing; the 932d Airlift Wing; the 934th Airlift Wing; the 940th Wing; and the 944th Fighter Wing.

Non-flying and non-combat wings 
Non-flying or non-combat wings, such as the 1st Medical Service Wing and 1st, 2d Weather Wing, 3rd-7th Weather Wings, 82nd Combat Security Police Wing, 501st and 601st Tactical Control Wings, 601st Tactical Air Control Wing, 602d Tactical Air Control Wing, later Air Control Wing, see above, 901st-908th Reserve Training Wings (906th at Miami (Miami News, June 24, 1951); 907th at Brooks AFB), Reserve Air Depot Training Wings, are listed in Charles A. Ravenstein, "Air Force Combat Wings: Lineage and Honors Histories 1947-77," Office of Air Force History, Washington, D.C. 1984, viii.

Air Depot Wings
Air Depot Wings included the 13th, 24th, 25th, 29th, 30th 39th, 59th, 73d, 75th Air Depot Wing, 77th Air Depot Wing, 80th Air Depot Wing, 85th Air Depot Wing, and 88th Air Depot Wings.

The 25th Air Depot Wing was activated at Hill Air Force Base, Utah, on 27 October 1949 with Brigadier General Norris B. Harbold assigned as the wing commander. The mission of the wing was to provide depot maintenance and supply support to four combat wings, with its normal assignment to the Air Materiel and Service Division, or to Air Materiel and Service Force. The wing was integrated into the Ogden Air Materiel Area from July to December 1950.

The 30th Air Depot Wing was located at RAF Sealand, but plans were made to relocate it to RAF Brize Norton, both in the UK. Most assigned personnel of the 30th Air Depot Group were reassigned to the 7558th Air Depot Group of the 59th Air Depot Wing, effective from 26 November 1951. All staff sections of the 30th Air Depot Wing were dissolved, and a Consolidated Adjutant and Military Personnel Section was formed. 30th Air Depot Wing was relieved from assignment to the 59th Air Depot Wing effective 27 November 1951. 30th Air Depot Wing began operating as a tenant organization at RAF Sealand, with base support for the wing being provided by the 7558th Air Depot Group as of 27 November 1951. Jurisdiction of RAF Sealand was transferred from the 30th Air Depot Wing to the 7558th Air Depot Wing on 27 November 1951.

The 75th Air Depot Wing arrived in South Korea (Chinhae) on January 2, 1953, replacing the 6405th Air Support Wing. May have been disestablished in January 1956.

The 7200th Air Depot Wing (ADW) at Erding Air Base, Federal Republic of Germany, was redesignated as the 85 ADW on 25 July 1949. The 85 ADW was transferred to Twelfth Air Force on 21 January 1951. On 10 July 1952, 85 ADW and its supporting units were reassigned from 12th Air Force to Headquarters, USAFE. On 1 December 1953, all units of the 85 ADW were inactivated. Personnel assigned to Headquarters 85 ADW were reassigned to the newly activated 7485th Air Depot Wing.

Notes

References
 
 

Inactive AFCON Wings
Inactive AFCON Wings